Barimo is a village in the Višegrad Municipality in Bosnia and Herzegovina and the site of the Barimo Massacre. According to the 1991 census, it had a population of 78 people.

References

Villages in Republika Srpska